Dancing for Decadence is the fourth studio album by Montreal based punk band The Sainte Catherines. It was released in 2006 on Fat Wreck Chords.

Track listing

References

2006 albums
Fat Wreck Chords albums
The Sainte Catherines albums